Chromosome 8 open reading frame 82 is a protein encoded in humans by the C8orf82 gene.

Gene 
C8orf82 is a gene located on the minus strand of chromosome 8 in the species Homo sapiens at locus 8q24. The gene is 3,400 bases long and contains 3 exons.

mRNA 
The mRNA produced by the C8orf82 gene is 1,979 base pairs long with coding sequence that starts at base 159 and ends at base 809. According to NCBI Gene there are no alternative transcripts or isoforms. AceView lists several alternative transcripts and isoforms, the existence of which is uncertain.

Homology 
C8orf82 is conserved among invertebrates, fish, reptiles, mammals, and protists. C8orf82 was not found to be conserved among bacteria, archaea, plants, fungi, or trichoplax. The domain of unknown function DUF4505 seems to be well conserved among most orthologs.

Orthologs 
Below is a table of orthologs obtained using Blast.

Evolutionary history 
C8orf82 does not belong to a specific gene family and has no other known alternative splice isoforms. This holds true for its most distant ancestor as well.

The above graph show's how the behavior of C8orf82's percent of amino acid changes over time is similar to that of fibrinogen and vastly different from cytochrome c indicating a very slow rate of change over time.

Below is a graph that depicts the percent identity change of the orthologs listed in the ortholog table based on the orthologs dates of divergence.

Protein 
The C8orf82 gene encodes for the protein termed UPF0598 protein C8orf82 or just C8orf82.

General properties 
The protein is 216 amino acids long and contains a domain of unknown function DUF4505. This domain of unknown function is also known as pfam14956. The protein has a molecular weight of 23.8 kDa and an isoelectric point of 9.36.

Compositional features 
Isoleucine (0.5%) and lysine (1.4%) within C8orf82 were found to occur in lower frequencies compared to other normal human proteins, while proline(9.7%) and arginine (10.6%) had slightly higher occurrence frequencies.

Post-translational modifications 
Predicted post-translational modifications based on ExPASy tests include phosphorylation sites at several serines, threonines, and tyrosines. In addition tyrosine sulfation, sumoylation, O-linked glycosylation, O-ß-GlcNAc attachment sites and an NES motif was also detected.

Subcellular localization 
C8orf82 is predicted to be localized within the mitochondria using PSORT II analysis. The results of a k-NN prediction attributed 60.9% to mitochondrial localization and 26.1% to nuclear localization.

Interacting proteins 
ETFA has been shown to interact with C8orf82 using high-throughput affinity-purification mass spectrometry.

Expression 
Using antibody staining, most normal cells showed moderate cytoplasmic and nuclear immunoreactivity. Strong staining was observed in placental trophoblasts. Lymphoid tissues, glial cells and myocytes were weakly stained or negative. A staining analysis was also done on cancer cells and the results were as follows; a majority of malignant cells displayed weak to moderate positivity. Many cases of malignant carcinoids and lymphomas were negative. In all these tests, only a single antibody was used (CAB034331).

Microarray data has shown C8orf82 to be ubiquitously expressed.
An EST profile for C8orf82 also shows ubiquitous expression.

References

Uncharacterized proteins